Sulo Salo (16 November 1909 – 12 May 1995) was a Finnish footballer. He played in three matches for the Finland national football team from 1937 to 1941. He was also part of Finland's team for their qualification matches for the 1938 FIFA World Cup.

References

External links
 

1909 births
1995 deaths
Finnish footballers
Finland international footballers
Place of birth missing
Association footballers not categorized by position